Kielmeyera coriacea (pau santo) is a medicinal plant native to Cerrado and Pantanal vegetation in Brazil. It is also used as a honey plant.

Notes

References

coriacea
Endemic flora of Brazil
Trees of Brazil
Flora of the Cerrado
Medicinal plants of South America
Taxa named by Carl Friedrich Philipp von Martius
Plants described in 1825